The Fort Worth Police Department (FWPD) is the police department of Fort Worth, Texas, United States. Neil Noakes  is the Chief of Police.

FWPD is responsible for traffic and general law enforcement within the city limits of Fort Worth. Specialty divisions include investigation, K-9, bicycle patrol, and SWAT.

History 

The Fort Worth Police Department started on April 12, 1873 when E.M. Terrell was appointed City Marshal with a force of four officers. However, the force was disbanded a month later for economic reasons. The force was re-established in 1876 to cope with unruly cowboys and high levels of prostitution, with Jim Courtright being instated as City Marshal with two assisting deputies. Courtright's reputation as an Army scout and gunfighter led to an unprecedented term of nonviolence in Fort Worth. By 1887, the force had grown to six officers and a Chief of Police.

The early 20th century saw many innovations to the FWPD, including motorcycles, traffic tickets, stoplights, and the city's first female officer. The mid-1900s saw even more technological advances, with the addition of a crime laboratory and radar speed detectors. Throughout the 1990s and early 2000s, the department sought to establish better links to the community, instituting programs such as "forums," a series of monthly department-citizen meetings, and the Citizens on Patrol program.

In 2008, after the retirement of Chief Ralph Mendoza, Executive Deputy Patricia Kneblick was briefly appointed interim chief, making her the first woman ever to be appointed Chief of Police in Fort Worth. Jeffrey Halstead, a Commander with the Phoenix Police Department, replaced Kneblick in December 2008, making him the city's 24th chief.

In 2015, Joel Fitzgerald became the 1st African-American police chief of the city. Fitzgerald holds a Ph.D in Business Administration from Northcentral University; an MBA from Eastern University; and an undergraduate degree from Villanova University.   He has since become the Waterloo Police Department Chief of Police. Interim Chief Ed Kraus was named until a replacement is selected by city officials. He was later selected to permanently fill the position.

In 2022,  Monica Martin, a native of East Fort Worth, was selected to serve as Commander of the East Division. This is history in the making because Commander Martin is the first Black female police officer to secure an appointment within the executive staff of the Fort Worth Police Department.

Uniforms 
The department's uniforms and badges have changed multiple times before the present standards. Early uniforms were all produced in various shades of blue, with garments ranging from coats with brass buttons to cloaks. Headwear was particularly diverse - depending on the uniform, officers in the early 1900s wore custodian helmets, ten-gallon cowboy hats, or slouched hats resembling those of Civil War cavalrymen.

The department has worn five different badges throughout its history; the current design, which features a shield topped by a panther, was first worn in 1912. The current patch design, which features a star and longhorn head, was adopted in 1977.

The current uniform consists of a navy blue shirt and pants with black tactical boots. The badge is worn on the left chest, and patches are worn on either shoulder. Ceremonial dress is similar to the duty uniform, with the addition of a white fourragère, cotton gloves, white duty belt and pouches, and a navy blue peaked cap.  Officers often wear black felt (winter) or straw (summer) cowboy hats as part of the uniform (as do many other police agencies in Texas).

Organization
Under the Chief of police Neil Noakes, the Fort Worth Police department is broken down into three bureaus (Patrol, Support, and Finance/Personnel)

Assistant Chief Robert Alldredge is over the Patrol Bureau.
Patrol Bureau is farther broken down into two Commands (North and South)
Deputy Chief Pedro Criado is over the North Command
Deputy Chief Mark Barthen is over the South Command

Assistant Chief Joseph Sparrow is over the Support Bureau. 
Support Bureau is farther broken down into two Commands (Tactical and Investigative/Support)
Deputy Chief Gregory Weathers is over the Tactical Command
Deputy Chief Paula Fimbres is over the Investigative and Support Command

Assistant Chief Julie Swearingin is over the Finance/Personnel Bureau. 
Deputy Chief Ty Hadsell is over the Operational Command

The Fort Worth Police Department is divided into six Patrol Divisions: Central, North, South, East, Northwest and West, each encompassing various areas of the city. Divisions are further divided into four Neighborhood Policing Districts each.

The general areas of the city included in each Patrol Division are:

Central Division -  Commander Amy Ladd 
 Downtown
 Hospital District
 Texas Christian University

North Division -  Commander Chad Mahaffey
 Fort Worth Stockyards
 Texas Motor Speedway
 North Fort Worth

Northwest Division - Commander Jason Kim

East Division -  Commander Monica Martin  
 East Fort Worth

West Division -  Commander Buck Wheeler
 Lake Worth
 Camp Bowie
 Museum District
 Fort Worth Zoo
 Texas Christian University

South Division -  Commander Roy Hudson 
 South Fort Worth

Vehicles 
The Fort Worth Police Department uses primarily sedans as patrol vehicles. All marked patrol units are painted in a traditional black-and-white color scheme. Older vehicles exhibit the word "Police" on the front quarter panel and the rear doors, with the words "Fort Worth" printed in black over an orange-tan longhorn head (the city's logo) on the front doors; newer vehicles place the word "Police" below the longhorn on the front door, and across the hood of the car in white.

The Fort Worth Police Department's primary replacement to the Ford Crown Victoria was the Ford Police Interceptor sedan. The Ford Police Interceptor sedan was later replaced by the Interceptor Utility. A fleet transition is currently underway moving to the primary use of the Chevrolet Tahoe PPV SUV. Dodge Chargers were used alongside Tahoe’s for a short time, yet some fleet issues encouraged the current transition to the sole use of Chevrolet Tahoe PPV’s for everyday patrol use. The department's Traffic Division mainly utilizes police issue BMW motorcycles and Dodge Chargers to complete its freeway enforcement duties.

Patrol Vehicles
 Ford Crown Victoria Police Interceptor
 Dodge Charger
 Chevrolet Impala
 Ford Taurus (Police Interceptor)
 Ford Explorer (Police Interceptor Utility)
 Chevrolet Tahoe PPV

Trucks
 Ford F-250

Aircraft
 Bell 206B Helicopter
 Bell 505 Helicopter

Tactical
 LENCO BearCat

Sidearms

In 2010, officers began using either the Glock 17 or 22, in 9x19 Parabellum and .40 S&W, respectfully. This was done to reduce costs from the Sig Sauer P226.

Rank structure and insignia

Line-of-duty deaths
Since the establishment of the Fort Worth Police Department, 58 officers have died in the line of duty.

The causes of death are as follows:

Fallen officers are recognized publicly at the Fort Worth Police and Firefighters' Memorial on 7th Street.

Demographics
Male: 83 percent
Female: 17 percent
White: 75 percent
Hispanic: 13 percent
African-American/Black: 12 percent

See also
List of law enforcement agencies in Texas
Tarrant County Sheriff's Office
Killing of Atatiana Jefferson

References

External links
 The official Fort Worth Police Department website
 FWPD officers' memorial page
  Fort Worth Police Officers Association
 Fort Worth Latino Police Officers' Association
 Fort Worth Police Historical Association
 Fort Worth Police Department - Advanced Training Unit - ATU